Heinz Schumann (born 6 August 1936) is a German sprinter. He competed in the men's 100 metres at the 1964 Summer Olympics. He was born in Brazil to German parents.

References

1936 births
Living people
Athletes (track and field) at the 1964 Summer Olympics
German male sprinters
Olympic athletes of the United Team of Germany
Brazilian people of German descent
Athletes from São Paulo